Tropical Smoothie Cafe, also referred to as Tropical Smoothie, or Tropical, is a restaurant franchise in the United States. In addition to smoothies, the cafes offer sandwiches, wraps, salads, flat breads, and introduced bowls to their food line in 2017. Tropical Smoothie Cafe operates more than 1150 locations nationwide.

History

Tropical Smoothie began as a smoothie shop in 1993 along the panhandle of Florida. Tropical Smoothie Franchise Development Corporation was founded in 1997 in Destin, Florida, and the first franchised store opened in 1998 in Tallahassee, Florida. Tropical Smoothie Cafe is currently headquartered in Atlanta, Georgia.

In 1999, they introduced a line of food items including sandwiches and wraps. As more locations opened, the individual Cafes redesigned their store decor to offer a beach house theme with bright white walls, an open kitchen concept, vibrant colors, and tropical artwork.

In 2006, Tropical Smoothie Cafe opened their 200th store in Virginia Beach, Virginia, and in 2011 they opened their 300th store in Fort Myers, Florida. They opened their 400th location in Toledo, Ohio, 500th location in Westland, Michigan, and in 2017 their 600th location in Joplin, Missouri. They opened their 800th location in Arlington Heights, IL in 2019.

Founders and original owners, Eric and Delora Jenrich and David Walker, came from franchise backgrounds and used that knowledge to grow Tropical Smoothie Cafe.  As they grew, they recruited others from the food industry.

In 2012, private equity firm Buckhead Investment Partners (BIP) bought a controlling interest in Tropical Smoothie Cafe. Founders Eric Jenrich and David Walker, the former owners of Tropical Smoothie Cafe, remained on the board of directors, and former Chief Operating Officer Mike Rotondo was promoted to replace Jenrich as chief executive officer in 2012, until his departure in 2018. BIP partner Scott Pressly, who was a financial and strategic adviser to the chain since 2007 served as the chairman until 2020. The brand was acquired by private equity firm Levine Leichtman Capital Partners (LLCP) in September 2020.  Charles Watson currently serves as the chief executive officer.

Since 2019, the company has been the title sponsor of the Frisco Bowl.

Menu
Tropical Smoothie Cafe's menu includes smoothies, sandwiches, flat-breads, wraps, bowls, and breakfast items. Their smoothies are grouped into the following categories: "super veggies", "balanced fusions", "fruit blends", "tropical treats", and "kids" and supplements can also be added to any smoothie. The best-selling smoothie has continued to be the Island Green.

Tropical Smoothie Cafes sales are made up of 50% smoothie sales and 50% food sales system wide.

In May 2013, Tropical Smoothie Cafe began offering a vegan, non-GMO meat substitute called Beyond Meat. Beyond Meat is made of a blend of faba bean protein, pea protein, flours, and fiber.  In July 2013, Tropical Smoothie Cafe announced that Beyond Meat would become a permanent fixture on the menu at certain locations.

References

1993 establishments in Florida
American companies established in 1993
Destin, Florida
Juice bars
Restaurant chains in the United States
Restaurants established in 1993
Smoothie chains in the United States